Damir Dugonjič (born 21 February 1988) is a Slovenian swimmer who competed for his native country at the 2008, 2012 and 2016 Summer Olympics. He competed in 100 metre breaststroke in all three Games, where he finished 16th, 18th and 21st respectively.

He attended school and swam for the USA's University of California, Berkeley from 2007–2011. At the 2010 NCAA Division I Men's Swimming & Diving Championships, he won the 100 breaststroke.

References

1988 births
Living people
Slovenian male swimmers
Olympic swimmers of Slovenia
Swimmers at the 2008 Summer Olympics
Swimmers at the 2012 Summer Olympics
Swimmers at the 2016 Summer Olympics
California Golden Bears men's swimmers
Medalists at the FINA World Swimming Championships (25 m)
European Aquatics Championships medalists in swimming
People from Ravne na Koroškem
Mediterranean Games gold medalists for Slovenia
Swimmers at the 2013 Mediterranean Games
Mediterranean Games medalists in swimming
21st-century Slovenian people